Arman Tateos Manookian (May 15, 1904 – May 10, 1931) was an Armenian-American painter best known for his works depicting Hawaiian scenes.

Early life
Manookian was the oldest of three children born to a Christian Armenian family in Istanbul.  As a teenager, he survived the Armenian genocide.  Manookian immigrated to the United States in 1920. At the age of 16 he studied illustration at the Rhode Island School of Design.  Later he took classes at the Art Students League of New York before enlisting in the United States Marine Corps in 1923.  While serving in the U. S. Marine Corps he was assigned as a clerk to the author and historian, Major Edwin North McClellan.
He ended his life committing suicide, using poison,  because of his severe depression.

Career

In 1927, Manookian was honorably discharged from the Marine Corps, but remained in Hawaii.  He worked for the Honolulu Star-Bulletin and for Paradise of the Pacific.  While in the Marines, Manookian had supplied illustrations for Leatherneck Magazine and produced about 75 ink drawings for McClellan's history of the United States Marine Corps, which was never published. These drawings are now in the collection of the Honolulu Museum of Art. His oil paintings are rare and highly valued based on their almost iconic status and scarcity due to his early death, by suicide, in 1931. Only 31 of his oil paintings are known to exist.  The Honolulu Academy of Arts held a memorial exhibition shortly after Manookian's death and a retrospective exhibition titled Meaning in Color/Expression in Line: Arman Manookian’s Modernism Nov. 4, 2010 through April 24, 2011.  The Bishop Museum and the Honolulu Museum of Art are among the public collections holding works by Arman T. Manookian. According to the State of Hawaii's House of Representatives, he is "known as Hawaii's Van Gogh".

In early 2010 a group of seven Manookian paintings owned by the Hotel Hana-Maui were removed from public display. They were the only Manookian oil paintings known to be on public display anywhere in the world.  Two of the murals, Red Sails and Hawaiian Boy and Girl, are now on long-term loan to the Honolulu Museum of Art.

From July 3, 2014, to January 11, 2015, a number of Manookian paintings were on display at the Honolulu Museum of Art including Red Sails, Hawaiian Boy and Girl, Breadfruit, Pele, and Weaver.

References
 Forbes, David W., Encounters with Paradise: Views of Hawaii and its People, 1778-1941, Honolulu Academy of Arts, 1992, 212–256.
 Gard, Rowan, “Escape into Color”, Innov8, Mar/April 2011, pp. 36–39.
 Papanikolas, Theresa, "Meaning in Color/ Expression in Line: Arman Manookian’s Modernism", Honolulu Academy of Arts, Vol. 82, No. 6, Nov/Dec 2010, pp. 4–5.
 Papanikolas, Theresa and DeSoto Brown, Art Deco Hawai'i, Honolulu, Honolulu Museum of Art, 2014, pp. 86–93
 Sandulli, Justin M., Troubled Paradise: Madge Tennent at a Hawaiian Crossroads, Durham, NC: Duke University, 2016.
 Seed, John,  
 Seed, John 
 Seed, John A., Arman Manookian: An Armenian Artist in Hawai'i, Published by blurb.com, 2011, 36.
 Severson, Don R., Finding Paradise, Island Art in Private Collections, University of Hawaii Press, 2002, 124.

Notes

1904 births
1931 deaths
Armenian painters
American muralists
American people of Armenian descent
Art Students League of New York alumni
Artists who committed suicide
Armenians from the Ottoman Empire
Emigrants from the Ottoman Empire to the United States
United States Marines
Artists from Istanbul
Painters from Hawaii
20th-century American painters
American male painters
1931 suicides
20th-century American male artists